XXV World Rhythmic Gymnastics Championships were held in New Orleans, United States from 10th to 14 July 2002. The competition was open to groups only and the designated apparatuses were Ribbon and Ball & Rope.

Competitors
There were participants from 25 countries including Belarus, Brazil, Bulgaria, Canada, China, Cuba, France, Germany, Greece, Hungary, Italy, Japan, Poland, Russia, Slovakia, South Korea, Spain, Switzerland, Ukraine and United States.

Medal winners

Results

Group all-around

Group 5 ribbons

Group 3 balls + 2 ropes

References

Rhythmic Gymnastics World Championships
Rhythmic Gymnastics Championships
International gymnastics competitions hosted by the United States
2002 in American sports